Simon John Scott Clarke (2 April 1938 – 12 October 2017) was an English rugby union footballer who played internationally for England. He also played first-class cricket.

Clarke, a scrum-half, made his Test debut in the 1963 Five Nations Championship. He appeared in all four fixtures, to help England claim their 17th title. Soon after, he took part in England's 1963 tour of Australasia. He played two Tests against New Zealand and one against Australia in Sydney, scoring the only try of his career in the latter. The following year, New Zealand toured England and Clarke played a Test against the All Blacks at Twickenham. He played the remaining five Tests of his career during both the 1964 and 1965 Five Nations Championships.

A right-handed batsman, Clarke got his first taste of first-class cricket in 1958 when he played for a Combined Services team against Lancashire. He made further first-class appearances in 1961 and 1962, for Cambridge University.  In 14 first-class innings he amassed a total of only 99 runs, with a highest score of just 19.

References

1938 births
2017 deaths
People educated at Alleyn Court School
English rugby union players
England international rugby union players
English cricketers
Cambridge University cricketers
Combined Services cricketers
Rugby union players from Essex
Rugby union scrum-halves